Sir William Te Rangiua "Pou" Temara  (born 1948) is a New Zealand academic. Prior to working at Waikato, he taught at Victoria University of Wellington, where he also studied, and at Te Whare Wānanga o Awanuiārangi.

Early life
Temara was born in 1948. He was raised by his grandparents in a Māori language environment in the Ureweras until he was eight years old, when he was sent to an English-language boarding school in Auckland. He is the nephew of Māori language activist Jean Puketapu. His uncle Makarini Temara was on the first Waitangi Tribunal in 1975.

Professional life 
Temara has been a member of the Waitangi Tribunal since 2008 and is currently chair of the Repatriation Advisory Panel at Museum of New Zealand Te Papa Tongarewa. He is a member of the Tūhoe Waikaremoana Māori Trust Board and chair of Te Hui Ahurei a Tūhoe within his iwi (tribe), Ngāi Tūhoe. He is on Kingi Tuheitia's 'Council of Twelve.'

Television 
He was the presenter of Korero Mai, Television New Zealand's first Māori language series.

Honours

In the 2016 Queen's Birthday Honours, Temara was appointed a Companion of the New Zealand Order of Merit, for services to Māori and education. In the 2021 New Year Honours, he was promoted to Knight Companion. He is a Companion of the Royal Society of New Zealand.

References

External links
Pou Temara - Māori and Indigenous Studies: University of Waikato

1948 births
Living people
Ngāi Tūhoe people
New Zealand Māori academics
Academic staff of the University of Waikato
Māori language revivalists
Academic staff of Te Whare Wānanga o Awanuiārangi
Academic staff of the Victoria University of Wellington
Victoria University of Wellington alumni
Members of the Waitangi Tribunal
Knights Companion of the New Zealand Order of Merit
Companions of the Royal Society of New Zealand